Moravče pri Gabrovki is a settlement in the Municipality of Litija in central Slovenia. The area is part of the traditional region of Lower Carniola. It is now included with the rest of the municipality in the Central Sava Statistical Region.

Name
The name of the settlement was changed from Moravče to Moravče pri Gabrovki in 1953. In the past the German name was Moräutsch.

Church
The local church is dedicated to Saint Hermagoras and  belongs to the Parish of Gabrovka. It is a 16th-century building, first mentioned in written documents dating to 1526. Its main altar dates to 1674.

References

External links
Moravče pri Gabrovki on Geopedia

Populated places in the Municipality of Litija